Mohan Lal Chakma (c. 1912 – 21 June 2013) was an Indian politician. He was MLA for Penchartal, Tripura (1978–83).

He died on 21 June 2013 at the age of 101.

References

1910s births
2013 deaths
Tripura politicians
Indian centenarians
Men centenarians
Date of birth unknown
Place of birth unknown
Place of death missing